Special Squad may refer to:

Films and television 
 Special Squad (Australian TV series), a 1984 Australian crime drama television series
 Special Squad (Indian TV series), a 2005–2006 Indian crime drama television series
 Special Squad (film), a 1995 Indian Malayalam film 
 Colt 38 Special Squad, a 1976 Italian poliziottesco film
 Restol, The Special Rescue Squad, a 1999 Korean animated film

Others 
 Special Night Squads, a British-Jewish counter-insurgency unit established by Captain Orde Wingate in Palestine in 1938, during the 1936–1939 Arab revolt
 Special Demonstration Squad, an undercover unit of Greater London 's Metropolitan Police Service (MPS or the Met), set up in 1968